The 1930–31 PCHL season was the third season of the professional men's ice hockey Pacific Coast Hockey League, a minor professional league with teams in the western United States and western Canada. It consisted of four teams: Vancouver Lions, Seattle Eskimos, Portland Buckaroos and Tacoma Tigers.

It was the last season of the first incarnation of the PCHL. It was followed by the 1936–37 PCHL season in the second incarnation of the league.

The season did not run 36 games as the previous two seasons as Tacoma Tigers dropped out of the league after 10 games. The two best teams in the league standings met in a best-of-five playoff format series for league championship honors.

Final standings 
Note: W = Wins, L = Losses, T = Ties, GF= Goals For, GA = Goals Against
Teams that qualified for the playoffs are highlighted in bold

Source:

Playoffs
Vancouver Lions defeated Seattle Eskimos 3 games to 0.

References

Notes

1930–31 in Canadian ice hockey
1930–31 in American ice hockey